Tatra KT4 is the name of a four-axle type articulated tramcar developed by the Czech firm ČKD Tatra. The first pre-production vehicles entered service in Potsdam in 1975, with the first production vehicles in 1977. A total of 1,747 units were built, with initial deliveries to East Germany (DDR) and later to the USSR and SFR Yugoslavia. KT4 variants were built for both standard gauge and metre gauge tramways. Production of the KT4 tramcar was halted in 1991 due to worldwide economic and political changes at the time. Production was briefly resumed in 1997 to construct the last 20 units for Belgrade, Serbia.

Since the start of the 1990s, many of the earliest production tramcars have gone through extensive refurbishment and rebuilding, including the replacement of folding doors and the installation of low-floor center sections.

The design of the tram, being without a bogie over the joint necessitates a scissor joint connecting both bogies such that the center of mass does not shift catastrophically, especially when turning.

History 

The KT4 was originally designed to demands set out by the needs of the GDR, who found bogie cars too expensive and needed a solution to their aging fleet of two-axle vehicles. The first steps into the KT4s design were made when ČKD Tatra modified a six-axle K2 tramcar, to a four-axle suspended articulation formation which later presented itself in the KT4. The KT4 has identical pedal control systems and bogies to the Tatra T3 bogie tramcar. As production continued, the design was improved, noted particularly in 1983 with the addition of thyristor control type TV3. The type is called KT4t.

Variations 
Variations of the KT4 exist, though they are generally subtle and focused around seat layout and pantograph type. 
 KT4D – German model
 KT4Dt – German model with TV3 thyristor
 KT4SU – Soviet Union model
 KT4YU – Yugoslav model
Note that there is no such thing as a KT4K. KT4 used in North Korea were not built by Tatra, instead built by the Shenyeng Passenger Vehicle Factory and named differently.

KT4D 
The KT4D model was delivered to the following GDR cities:

In 1984, Leipzig handed over their eight trams to Berlin. Since the early 2000s, the Tatra tramcars in the former GDR are being replaced and sold to other countries in Central and Eastern Europe.

Original KT4D

Modernised KT4D

Sold KT4Ds

KT4SU 
The Soviet Union ordered the KT4SU for their meter-gauge tramways, the following cities received deliveries:

KT4YU 
The KT4YU is the Yugoslav variant of the tramcar, which were delivered to the Serbian and Croatian capitals. The last KT4s ever produced were delivered to Belgrade in 1997. Those tramcars were equipped with IGBT modules and recuperative braking and named KT4M-YUB (where B stands for Belgrade to be distinguished from Zagreb model). In 2002, 30 Belgrade tramcars were modernized in Goša FOM / Inekon, and marked as KT4-YUBM.

Shenyang ST4 
A series of KT4 trams were also produced for Pyongyang, North Korea by the Shenyeng Passenger Vehicle Factory in China named ST4, but have subsequently had their articulation removed due to structural defects of the joint. During their service, they were based at Songsin depot. These trams were fully withdrawn in 1999 and the bodies rebuilt into Chollima 971 articulated trolleybuses or Chollima 961 trolleybuses. Since then, some Chollima 971 trolleybuses were converted into Chollima 961 trolleybuses by removing the rear section. 150 trams were ordered, though only 51 vehicles are known to have been recorded.

These vehicle's main difference was its 2.5 meter wide body, four 45 kW traction motors, a maximum speed of 60 km/h, a seating capacity of 56 and standing capacity of 125. Its weight was also higher, at a net weight of 22.5 tons.

See also
 Tatra KTNF6
 GT4 (tram)

References 

Statistical Data, is duplicated from TatraWagen.de (In German)

External links

(German) Ivo Köhler: KT4 – Der Kurzgelenkwagen aus Prag, Verlag GVE, Berlin 2009, 

Tatra trams
Tram vehicles of Croatia
Tram vehicles of Estonia
Tram vehicles of Germany
Tram vehicles of Latvia
Tram vehicles of Serbia
Tram vehicles of Ukraine
Tram vehicles of China